Urney is a townland (of 188 acres) and civil parish in County Tyrone, Northern Ireland. Both townland and parish are situated in the historic barony of Strabane Lower. It lies within the Derry City and Strabane area.

Urney is notable as being the first manufacturing location of Urney Chocolates, established in 1919.

It was also the birthplace of William Burke, notorious for the Burke and Hare murders.

Civil parish of Urney

Townlands
The civil parish of Urney contains the following townlands:

B
Backtown, Ballycolman, Ballyfatten, Ballylennan Scott, Bellspark, Berrysfort, Bridgetown

C
Carricklee, Carrickone, Castlegore, Castlesessagh, Castletown, Cavan, Churchtown, Clady, Craigmonaghan (Nelson), Creevy Lower, Creevy Upper

D
Dartans, Donnygowen, Drumeagle

F
Flushtown, Fort-town, Freughlough

G
Gallany, Ganvaghan Kyle, Glebe, Glebe (Old), Glentimon, Glentown, Gortlogher

H
Hunterstown

I
Ichenay, Ichenny Upper, Inisclan

K
Kennystown, Kilclean, Kilcroagh, Kinkit

L
Learmore, Liggartown, Lisdoo

M
Magheragar, Magirr, Mount Bernard, Munie

P
Peacockbank, Prospect, Pullyernan

R
Rabstown

S
Scotstown, Seein, Skerryglass, Somervillestown, Stephenstown

T
Tullydoortans, Tullymoan, Tullywhisker

U
Urney, Urney Glebe

Townland of Urney
The townland is situated in the Barony of Strabane Lower and the civil parish of Urney and covers an area of 188 acres.

The population of the townland declined slightly during the 19th century:

See also
List of civil parishes of County Tyrone
List of townlands of County Tyrone

References 

Townlands of County Tyrone